The 2014 California Superintendent of Public Instruction election was held on November 4, 2014, to elect the Superintendent of Public Instruction of California. Unlike most other elections in California, the Superintendent is not elected under the state's "top-two primary". Instead, the officially nonpartisan position is elected via a nonpartisan primary election, with a runoff only held if no candidate receives a majority of the vote.

Incumbent Superintendent Tom Torlakson ran for re-election to a second term in office. In the primary election on June 3, 2014, no candidate received a majority of the vote, so the top two finishers, Torlakson and Marshall Tuck, contested a general election, which Torlakson won.

Primary election

Candidates
 Lydia Gutierrez, teacher, Coastal San Pedro Neighborhood Councilwoman and candidate for Superintendent in 2010
 Tom Torlakson, incumbent Superintendent of Public Instruction
 Marshall Tuck, educator, former CEO of Partnership for LA Schools and former President of Green Dot Public Schools

Results

General election

Polling

Results

See also
California Department of Education

References

External links
Candidate information
VoteCircle.com Non-partisan resources & vote sharing network for Californians
Information on the elections from California's Secretary of State

2014 California elections
California Superintendent of Public Instruction elections
California